Snowbasin Resort is a ski resort in the western United States, located in Weber County, Utah,  northeast of Salt Lake City, on the back (east) side of the Wasatch Range.

Opened  in 1939, as part of an effort by the city of Ogden to restore the Wheeler Creek watershed, it is one of the oldest continually operating ski resorts in the United States. One of the owners in the early days was Aaron Ross. Over the next fifty years Snowbasin grew, and after a large investment in lifts and snowmaking by owner Earl Holding, Snowbasin hosted the 2002 Winter Olympic alpine skiing races for downhill, combined, and super-G. The movie Frozen was filmed there in 2009.

Snowbasin is located on Mount Ogden at the west end of State Route 226, which is connected to I-84 and SR-39 via SR-167 (New Trappers Loop Road).

History
Snowbasin is one of the oldest continuously operating ski areas in the United States. Following the end of World War I and the Great Depression numerous small ski resorts were developed in Utah's snow-packed mountains, and Weber County wanted one of their own. They decided to redevelop the area in and around Wheeler Basin, a deteriorated watershed area that had been overgrazed and subjected to aggressive timber-harvesting.

Lands were restored and turned over to the U.S. Forest Service, and by 1938 the USFS and Alf Engen had committed to turning the area into a recreational site. The first ski tow was built in 1939 and in service at the new Snow Basin ski park. In 1940, the Civilian Conservation Corps (CCC) crew built the first access road to the new resort, allowing easy access for the general public.

In the 1950s, Sam Huntington of Berthoud Pass, Colorado, purchased Snow Basin from the City of Ogden and proceeded to expand the uphill capacity beyond the Wildcat single-seat wooden tower lift and the old rope tow. Overall, he installed a twin chair in place of the rope tow, and a platter-pull tow, later replaced by a twin chair, was installed at Porcupine, to the left of the steep rocky face of Mount Ogden.

The fourth NCAA Skiing Championships, the first in Utah, were held at Snow Basin in 1957. The downhill race course was set on the right side of the steep face of Mt. Ogden, on the slope called "John Paul Jones", named after an early Snow Basin skier. The John Paul Jones' run was only accessible with a 45-minute hike from the top of the Porcupine lift.

Anderl Molterer, of the Austrian national ski team competing there that weekend, approached Huntington and told him if a lift was built directly to the top of the John Paul Jones run, he would bring his world famous Austrian team to Snow Basin to train on it. Molterer said John Paul was the best downhill run in the world. 

Huntington said no he had other things to do. A lift to the top of John Paul was not to be built until Snowbasin received the rights to hold the alpine speed events for the 2002 Winter Olympics.

Huntington was killed five years later in 1962, as he was performing post-season maintenance, replacing an electrical fuse at the Porcupine lift. Several Ogden businessmen purchased Snow Basin from the Huntington family. 

One other major personality to come out of Snow Basin was M. Earl Miller, who ran the ski school from the mid-1950s until 1987. Miller played a key role in drafting the Professional Ski Instructors of America (PSIA) American Ski Technique in 1961.

Pete Seibert, founder of Vail, led a partnership which bought Snow Basin in 1978, but ran into financial difficulty in 1984. The area was sold that October to Earl Holding, owner of Sun Valley in Idaho, and it became "Snowbasin".

2002 Winter Olympics & Paralympics
Because it was to serve as an Olympic venue site, the U.S. Congress passed the Snowbasin Land Exchange Act in 1996 as part of the Omnibus Lands Bill. The act transferred  of National Forest System lands near the resort to the private ownership of Snowbasin, and identified a set of projects that were necessary for the resort to host the Olympic events.

During the 2002 Olympics, Snowbasin hosted the downhill, combined (downhill and slalom), and super-G events. The spectator viewing areas consisted of a stadium at the foot of the run, with two sections of snow terraces for standing along both sides of the run. The spectator capacity was 22,500 per event; 99.1 percent of tickets were sold, and 124,373 spectators were able to view events at the Snowbasin Olympic venue. During the 2002 Winter Paralympics, Snowbasin hosted the Alpine Skiing events, including downhill, super-G, slalom, and giant slalom.

Statistics

Mountain information

Top elevation: 
Base elevation: 
Vertical rise: 
Average yearly snowfall: 
Skiable area: 
Snowmaking area:

Trails

Total runs: 104
Run ratings: 7 easier, 30 more difficult, 35 most difficult, 32 expert only
Total Nordic trails: 5, approximately  
Nordic trail ratings: 3 easier, 1 more difficult, 1 most difficult
Terrain parks: 3
Terrain park ratings: The Crazy Kat (easier), Coyote (Intermediate), and Apex (Advanced) parks.
Superpipe: none

Lifts
Total lifts: 11
Chairlifts: 9
1 15-Person Tram
Mt. Allen Tram (Doppelmayr, 1998)
2 Gondolas
Strawberry Express (Doppelmayr, 1998)
Needles Express (Doppelmayr, 1998)
2 high speed six packs
Wildcat Express  (Doppelmayr, 2017)
Middle Bowl Express (Leitner-Poma, 2021)
2 high speed quads
John Paul Express (Doppelmayr, 1998)
Little Cat Express (Doppelmayr-CTEC, 2008)
2 triple chairlifts
 Becker (Albertsson-Stadeli, 1985)
 Porcupine (Albertsson-Stadeli, 1985)
Surface lifts: 3
2 Magic carpet
1 Hand rope surface tow (tubing hill)

Winter season
Ski season dates: late-November to mid-April (conditions permitting)
Operating hours: Gondola: 9:00 a.m. to 4:00 p.m. daily (some lifts close at 3:30 p.m. daily)Grizzly Center retail and rentals: 8:00 a.m. to 5:00 p.m.

Summer season
Summer season dates: Father's Day Weekend in June to First Weekend in October (conditions permitting)
Operating hours: 9:00 a.m. to 5:00 p.m. Saturday, Sunday and holidays
Total trails: 17, approximately 
Trail ratings: 4.5 easy, 6.5 moderate, 3 difficult, 3 hike only

References

External links

 
 Ski Utah - Resort Profile
 First Tracks online magazine - Article on Snowbasin's 2002 improvements
 Future Plans as of 2014 - 2014 Article about expansion and upgrades to Snowbasin

Venues of the 2002 Winter Olympics
Olympic alpine skiing venues
Ski areas and resorts in Utah
Sports venues in Weber County, Utah
Event venues established in 1939
1939 establishments in Utah